The Upper Harbour Local Board is one of the 21 local boards of the Auckland Council, and is one of the two boards overseen by the council's Albany Ward councillors.

The board is named for the upper reaches of Auckland's Waitematā Harbour. Its administrative area consists of the suburbs clustered around the upper reaches, and covers much of the north of Auckland's North Shore and part of West Auckland. 

The board is governed by six board members elected at-large.

Demographics

Upper Harbour Local Board Area had a population of 62,841 at the 2018 New Zealand census, an increase of 9,171 people (17.1%) since the 2013 census, and an increase of 19,965 people (46.6%) since the 2006 census. There were 19,737 households, comprising 30,900 males and 31,938 females, giving a sex ratio of 0.97 males per female. The median age was 35.7 years (compared with 37.4 years nationally), with 11,589 people (18.4%) aged under 15 years, 14,130 (22.5%) aged 15 to 29, 29,520 (47.0%) aged 30 to 64, and 7,602 (12.1%) aged 65 or older.

Ethnicities were 55.3% European/Pākehā, 5.1% Māori, 2.4% Pacific peoples, 39.6% Asian, and 4.4% other ethnicities. People may identify with more than one ethnicity.

The percentage of people born overseas was 50.8, compared with 27.1% nationally.

Although some people chose not to answer the census's question about religious affiliation, 53.1% had no religion, 33.9% were Christian, 0.2% had Māori religious beliefs, 2.6% were Hindu, 1.6% were Muslim, 2.2% were Buddhist and 1.5% had other religions.

Of those at least 15 years old, 16,953 (33.1%) people had a bachelor's or higher degree, and 4,851 (9.5%) people had no formal qualifications. The median income was $36,000, compared with $31,800 nationally. 11,400 people (22.2%) earned over $70,000 compared to 17.2% nationally. The employment status of those at least 15 was that 26,145 (51.0%) people were employed full-time, 7,245 (14.1%) were part-time, and 1,662 (3.2%) were unemployed.

2022-2025 term
The current board members elected at the 2022 election, in election order:
Anna Atkinson, Living Upper Harbour, (6744 votes) Chair person
Uzra Casuri Balouch, Independent, (6492 votes) Deputy Chairperson
Kyle Parker, Living Upper Harbour, (5915 votes)
John Mclean, Independent, (5677 votes)
Sylvia Yang, Living Upper Harbour, (5677 votes)
Callum Blair, Independent, (5349 votes)

2019–2022 term
The board members, elected in the 2019 local body elections, in election order:
Margaret Miles, Independent, (7323 votes)
Anna Atkinson, Living Upper Harbour, (6398 votes)
Lisa Whyte, not affiliated, (6071 votes)
Uzra Casuri Balouch, not affiliated, (5767 votes)
Nicholas Mayne, Living Upper Harbour, (5663 votes)
Brian Neeson, Independent, (5012 votes)

2016–2019 term
The board members, elected in the 2016 local body elections, in election order:
Lisa Whyte, Auckland Future, (7826 votes)
Margaret Miles, Independent, (6533 votes)
Brian Neeson, Independent, (6097 votes)
Uzra Casuri Balouch, not affiliated, (5434 votes)
John MClean, Independent, (5336 votes)
Nicholas Mayne, not affiliated, (4577 votes)

References

Local boards of the Auckland Region
Upper Harbour Local Board Area